The 2022 Sahlen's Six Hours of The Glen was a sports car race held at Watkins Glen International in Watkins Glen, New York on June 26, 2022. It was the seventh round of the 2022 IMSA SportsCar Championship and the third round of the 2022 Michelin Endurance Cup. The No. 10 WTR - Konica Minolta Acura piloted by Ricky Taylor and Filipe Albuquerque took the victory in DPi. In LMP2, the PR1/Mathiasen Motorsports No. 52 piloted by Ben Keating, Scott Huffaker, and Mikkel Jensen took the victory, while the No. 74 Riley Motorsports entry driven by Gar Robinson, Felipe Fraga, and Kay van Berlo took the victory in LMP3. In GTD Pro, the No. 23 Heart of Racing Team Aston Martin Vantage AMR GT3 piloted by Ross Gunn and Alex Riberas claimed victory after the No. 25 BMW M Team RLL BMW M4 GT3 were penalized post-race. In GTD, the No. 20 Heart of Racing Team Aston Martin Vantage AMR GT3 took the victory with Maxime Martin and Ian James.

Background

Entries

A total of 48 cars took part in the event, split across five classes. 7 were entered in DPi, 7 in LMP2, 11 in LMP3, 7 in GT Daytona Pro, and 17 in GTD.

Qualifying

Qualifying results

Results

Race 

 Penalized for not meeting the minimum drive time

References

External links

Sahlen's Six Hours of The Glen
Sahlen's Six Hours of The Glen
2022 WeatherTech SportsCar Championship season